Alice Mary Tait, OAM (born 23 May 1986), née Alice Mary Mills, is an Australian former sprint freestyle, butterfly and individual medley swimmer who represented Australia at the 2004 Athens Olympics and the 2008 Beijing Olympics winning two relay gold medals and a bronze.

Career
Trained by her coach Shannon Rollason at the Chandler Sports Complex along with her good friend Jodie Henry, Tait was selected to make her international debut at the 2002 Commonwealth Games in Manchester, England, at the age of 16, where she collected a gold in the 4 × 100 m freestyle relay, as well as competing in the finals of the 50 m freestyle and 200 m individual medley. She repeated this at the 2002 Pan Pacific Championships in Yokohama, Japan.

2003 saw a big improvement in Tait's performance on the international swimming stage, when she received two silver medals at the 2003 World Swimming Championships in Barcelona, Spain in the 200 m individual medley and 50 m freestyle, breaking the Commonwealth record in the former and the Australian record in the latter. She also collected a silver and bronze in the 4 × 200 m and 4 × 100 m freestyle relays respectively.

2004 was a somewhat mixed year for Tait. She was beaten into 3rd place at the Australian trials in both the 50 m and 100 m freestyle, meaning that she was forced to watch these events from the stands. However, along with teammates Libby Lenton, Petria Thomas, and Jodie Henry, she won gold with a world record time in the women's 4 × 100 meter relay; 3min 35.94s. Later, she performed much slower than her previous best in the 200 m individual medley, being eliminated in the final. She admitted that she had been distracted by the earlier relay triumph. She also picked up a gold by swimming in the heats for the victorious 4 × 100 m medley relay team.

Tait started 2005 by relocating to the Australian Institute of Sport along with Rollason and Henry. She started the year strongly, winning the 50 m and 100 m freestyle at the Australian championships, both in new personal best times, the former in Commonwealth record time. She also qualified in the 50 m butterfly in second place, and came third in the 100 m butterfly( but was not selected as each country is restricted to two entries, despite being ranked third in the world), all in new personal best times. However, she had a form slump at the 2005 World Swimming Championships in Montreal, Quebec, Canada, swimming much slower than at the selection trials, and missing the medals. She collected a gold medal as part of the 4 × 100 m freestyle relay team.

In 2006, Tait qualified and competed at the 2006 Commonwealth Games. She won bronze in the 50 m and 100 m freestyle behind Libby Lenton and Jodie Henry and in the 50 m butterfly behind Danni Miatke and Jessicah Schipper. She combined with Henry, Lenton and Shayne Reese to claim gold in the 4 × 100 m freestyle relay.

In late 2006, Tait missed selection for the 2007 World Aquatics Championships. She was part of the bronze medal-winning Australian team in the 4 × 100 m freestyle relay at the 2008 Summer Olympics.

In the 2005 Australia Day Honours, Tait was awarded the Medal of the Order of Australia for "service to sport as a Gold Medallist at the Athens 2004 Olympic Games".

Tait announced her retirement from sports in June 2012.

Personal life
Tait is married to the former Scottish Olympic swimmer Gregor Tait. Their first child, a boy named Vance Charlie Tait, was born in August 2015. In June 2018, they welcomed a second son, Miller Lee Tait.

See also

References

External links
 
 
 
 
 Alice Mills at the Melbourne 2006 Commonwealth Games
  (2002, 2006, 2010)

1986 births
Living people
Olympic swimmers of Australia
Australian female butterfly swimmers
Australian female freestyle swimmers
Australian female medley swimmers
Olympic gold medalists for Australia
Olympic bronze medalists for Australia
Olympic gold medalists in swimming
Olympic bronze medalists in swimming
Swimmers at the 2004 Summer Olympics
Swimmers at the 2008 Summer Olympics
Medalists at the 2004 Summer Olympics
Medalists at the 2008 Summer Olympics
Commonwealth Games gold medallists for Australia
Commonwealth Games bronze medallists for Australia
Commonwealth Games medallists in swimming
Swimmers at the 2006 Commonwealth Games
World record setters in swimming
World Aquatics Championships medalists in swimming
Medalists at the FINA World Swimming Championships (25 m)
Universiade medalists in swimming
Universiade gold medalists for Australia
Universiade bronze medalists for Australia
Medalists at the 2007 Summer Universiade
Medalists at the 2011 Summer Universiade
Recipients of the Medal of the Order of Australia
Australian Institute of Sport swimmers
Swimmers from Brisbane
21st-century Australian women
Medallists at the 2006 Commonwealth Games